This is a list of  all windmills and windmill sites which lie in the current ceremonial county of Nottinghamshire.


Locations

B - C

E - G

H - M

N

O - S

T - W

Notes

Mills in bold are still standing, known building dates are indicated in bold. Text in italics denotes indicates that the information is not confirmed, but is likely to be the case stated.

References

History of Nottinghamshire
Windmills in Nottinghamshire
Lists of windmills in England
Windmills